Ninotsminda (Georgian: ნინოწმინდა ; Armenian: Նինոծմինդա) is a town and a center of the eponymous municipality located in Georgia's southern district of Samtskhe-Javakheti. According to the 2014 census the town has a population of 5,144. The vast majority of the population are Armenians.

History
Translation of the current official name of the settlement means "Saint Nino" in English and it was given to the town in honor of the illuminator of Georgians St. Nino, in 1991.

During the Ottoman rule, this was a sanjak of Çıldır Eyaleti, called Altunkale, which means "golden castle" in Turkish.

Before 1991, the town of Ninotsminda was called Bogdanovka - a name going back to the history of the Doukhobor settlement in the region in the 1840s. After the conquest of Kars in 1878, some Doukhobors from Bogdanovka moved to the newly created Kars Oblast. Twenty years later, some of them (or their descendants) emigrated from Kars Oblast to Canada, where they established a short-lived village named Bogdanovka in Langham district of Saskatchewan. Another group of emigrants, coming straight from Georgian Bogdanovka, established another Bogdanovka near Pelly, Saskatchewan.

Demographics
The Georgian census of 2014 counted 24,491 residents in Ninotsminda municipality, of which 23,262 (95%) were Armenians, and 1,029 (4.2%) were Georgians.
In Soviet Union, Doukhobor population of the region was in comparatively favorable conditions, isolated from attention of civil officials as population of ethnically mixed borderline region. In the 1990s, following the collapse of Soviet Union and rise of nationalist pressure (both local Armenian and state-imposed Georgian), a significant part of remaining Russian settlers abandoned their homes to settle in Russia.

Notable people
Gurgen Dalibaltayan - Armenian general
Davit Lokyan - Armenian minister of Territorial and Development
Nairi Sedrakyan - Armenian mathematician

See also
 Samtskhe-Javakheti
 Heshtia

References

External links
Ninotsminda District
 Kalmakoff, Jonathan J. The Doukhobor Gazetteer

Cities and towns in Samtskhe–Javakheti